Sud-Kivu District was a district of the Belgian Congo and the Democratic Republic of the Congo. It roughly corresponded in area to the present South Kivu province.

Belgian Congo

Kivu District was created by an arrêté royal of 28 March 1912, which divided the Congo into 22 districts.
A 1912 map shows that the former Stanleyville District had been broken into a much smaller Stanleyville Districts and the new districts of Lowa, Ituri, Kivu and Maniema.
Kivu District became part of the Orientale Province created in 1913.
With the 1933 reorganization Orientale Province was divided into Stanleyville Province in the north and Costermansville Province in the south.
The boundaries of Maniema and Kivu had been adjusted, and these two districts made up Costermansville Province.

On 27 May 1947 Costermansville Province was renamed Kivu Province.
By 1954 it consisted of the districts of  Sud-Kivu, Nord-Kivu and Maniema.
A 1955–1957 map shows Sud-Kivu District bordered by Nord-Kivu District to the north, Rwanda-Burundi to the east, Tanganika District to the south and Maniema District to the west.

Post-Independence

On 10 May 1962 the administration of Kivu Province was taken over by the central government, which created the separate provinces of Maniema and Nord-Kivu.
Kivu Province was reunited on 28 December 1966.
On 20 July 1988 it was divided into the provinces of Maniema, North Kivu and South Kivu.

Maps

See also

Districts of the Belgian Congo

References

Sources

Districts of the Belgian Congo
Districts of Kivu Province